The Bai River, also known as Baisui River, is a right-bank tributary of the middle Xiang River and one of main tributaries of the Xiang in Hunan Province. It rises in Baishui Township of Guiyang County, Hunan. Its main stream runs generally southeast to northwest through Guiyang, Changning and Qiyang counties, and it joins the Xiang in Guanzikou of Baishui Town of Qiyang.

References

Rivers of Hunan